Hiraç Yagan (born 3 January 1989) is a retired football midfielder. Born in Belgium, he represented Armenia at international level. He is currently the sporting director of FC Stade Nyonnais.

Club career

Standard Liège 
Yagan began his career with Lierse S.K. and was scouted by Standard Liège in July 2006. He scored on his debut for Standard Liège against Tubize on 14 February 2009. In January 2010, he was loaned out to Tubize until July 2010.

International career

Armenia U21 
Though born in Belgium, Yagan chose to represent his country of descent and was called up for Armenia U-21 on 17 April 2009, just three days later played his first international match here.
He scored his first goal on his second game against Switzerland U-21 on 4 September 2009.

Armenia national team 
He made his debut for Armenia against Moldova on 12 August 2009.

Western Armenia 
Yagan has also turned out for Western Armenia, a team representing the Armenian indigenous people primarily from the region of Western Armenia which lays in today's Turkey.

Management career
From 2017 to the end of 2019, Yagan was the president of Armenian club FC Ararat Yerevan.

Yagan retired at the end of the 2018–19 season and was appointed sporting director of FC Stade Nyonnais.

Honours
 Standard Liège
Belgian First Division: 1
 2008/09

References

External links
Profile at standard.be

Living people
1989 births
Armenian footballers
Armenia international footballers
Armenian expatriate footballers
Belgian people of Armenian descent
People from Etterbeek
Belgian footballers
Belgian expatriate footballers
Footballers from Brussels
Standard Liège players
A.F.C. Tubize players
FC Gandzasar Kapan players
Royale Union Saint-Gilloise players
FC Meyrin players
Servette FC players
FC Stade Nyonnais players
Belgian Pro League players
Challenger Pro League players
Swiss Promotion League players
Swiss Challenge League players
Armenian Premier League players
Association football midfielders
Armenian expatriate sportspeople in Switzerland
Expatriate footballers in Switzerland
RAAL La Louvière players